

Year 308 (CCCVIII) was a leap year starting on Thursday (link will display the full calendar) of the Julian calendar. It was known in the Roman Empire as the Year of the Consulship of Diocletian and (Galerius) Maximianus (or, less frequently, year 1061 Ab urbe condita). The denomination 308 for this year has been used since the early medieval period, when the Anno Domini calendar era became the prevalent method in Europe for naming years.

Events 
 By place 

 Roman Empire 
 Winter: Emperor Galerius wins his third and final victory over the Sarmatians.
 April: In Rome, Emperor Maximian attempts to depose his son Maxentius, but the soldiers in Rome side with Maxentius and force Maximian to flee to the court of Constantine I.
 The overthrow of Maximian prompts the soldiers of Roman Africa to prop up the vicarius of Africa, Domitius Alexander, as a usurper.
 Constantine raids the territory of the Bructeri and builds a bridge across the Rhine at Cologne.
 November 11 – The Conference of Carnuntum: Attempting to keep peace within the Roman Empire, Galerius recalls Diocletian briefly from retirement, and they convene with Maximian. Diocletian persuades Maximian to return to retirement, and he and Galerius declare Maxentius a public enemy. Licinius is proclaimed Augustus of the west, while rival contender Constantine I is again declared Caesar.
 Bereft of his father's support, Maxentius increasingly presents himself as the Conservator Urbis Suae (Preserver of His Own City). Construction of the Basilica of Maxentius (or Basilica Nova), the largest building in the Roman Forum, is begun.
 Maxentius institutes toleration of the Christians in his territories.

 Asia 
 The Han Zhao Dynasty is established in northern China, marking the official inception of the long lasting Uprising of the Five Barbarians.

 By topic 

 Religion 
 May 27 or June 26 – Pope Marcellus I succeeds Pope Marcellinus as the 30th pope.

Births 
 Xie Shang (or Renzu), Chinese general (d. 357)

Deaths 
 Adrian of Batanea (or Eubulus), Christian martyr

References